Hesperotingis antennata is a species of lace bug in the family Tingidae. It is found in North America.

Subspecies
These two subspecies belong to the species Hesperotingis antennata:
 Hesperotingis antennata antennata Parshley, 1917
 Hesperotingis antennata borealis Parshley, 1917

References

Further reading

 
 

Tingidae
Articles created by Qbugbot
Insects described in 1917